The ORCA card (standing for One Regional Card for All) is a contactless, stored-value smart card system for public transit in the Puget Sound region of Washington, United States. The card is valid on most transit systems in the Seattle metropolitan area, including Sound Transit, local bus agencies, Washington State Ferries, the King County Water Taxi, and Kitsap Fast Ferries. It was launched in 2009 and is managed by the Central Puget Sound Regional Fare Coordination Project, a board composed of local transit agencies. 

The card is able to be loaded with "e-purse" value, similar to a debit card, and monthly passes. Cards are sold and reloaded at participating grocery stores, customer service centers, and ticket vending machines at transit stations. ORCA cards offer free transfers between transit systems within a two-hour window.

In 2018, the Central Puget Sound Regional Transit Authority (Sound Transit) contracted INIT (Innovations in Transportation, Inc.) to replace the legacy ORCA system with an account-based, open architecture system known as "next generation ORCA". The next-generation ORCA system will offer new payment options including mobile ticketing, maintain customer data security, and provide real-time account management and fare processing so customers can instantly add value to their account at any time. The new system is set to roll out in phases, which began with a new website and app in May 2022.

History 

Central Puget Sound transit agencies have collaborated in a region-wide fare system since 1991 with the introduction of U-PASS and later FlexPass. In 1996, voters approved Sound Move, which called for an integrated regional fare policy for a "one-ticket ride". That goal led to the creation of the PugetPass in 1999, which allowed transit riders to use a single pass for five transit agencies.

On April 29, 2003, an agreement to implement a smart card system between the seven agencies in the Central Puget Sound Regional Fare Coordination Project (Sound Transit, King County Metro, Community Transit, Everett Transit, Pierce Transit, Kitsap Transit, and Washington State Ferries) was signed along with a $43 million contract awarded to ERG Transit Systems (now Vix Technology) as the vendor and system integrator of the project. The ORCA card was originally anticipated to be operational in 2006.

Between November 9 and December 22, 2006, as many as 6,000 transit riders were asked to participate in a live test of the smart card system. The test was conducted on selected routes of the seven participating agencies. The University of Washington conducted a separate test for integrating ORCA with the Husky Card and U-PASS during the same period.

A limited rollout of the ORCA system began on April 20, 2009, which allowed remaining technical issues in the system to be resolved. An extensive rollout and public outreach campaign followed in June 2009. Blank cards were available at no charge during the introductory period, which lasted until March 1; from then on, the card cost $5 ($3 for reduced fare permit holders). Users of PugetPasses, FlexPasses, and other passes were to be gradually transitioned to ORCA.

Launch timeline 
The ORCA launch press kit gave a launch timeline as follows:
 April 17, 2009 – Press release announcing launch of ORCA.
 April 20, 2009 – Orcacard.com and 1-888-988-ORCA call center launches. Customer Service Offices begin ORCA card distribution.
 May 2009 – Sounder Ticket Vending Machines (TVMs) begin ORCA card distribution. "ORCA is Here" inserts and posters appear in Customer Service Offices and on board buses, trains, and ferries. Switch began of Reduced Fare customers and Business Accounts to ORCA (continued into 2010).
 June 2009 – "ORCA is Here!" radio and print ads and bus billboards appear. Public outreach campaign with blank card distribution.
 July 2009 – Link light rail service begins and Link TVMs begin ORCA card distribution.
 Jan 1, 2010 – Elimination of intersystem paper transfers.
Fall 2010 – The planned replacement of University of Washington student and employee ID cards with ORCA-integrated photo ID cards was delayed until sometime in 2011. The U-PASS and the King County employee passes were to be dual purpose passes and were to include the ORCA chip.
May 2013 – 120 retail stores from QFC, Safeway, and Saar's begin selling ORCA cards
2015 – The regional day pass debuts

Next generation project

The ORCA Joint Board approved a capital-and-service contract with INIT in 2018 to design and implement a major overhaul of the ORCA system, including new cards, mobile ticketing, and compatibility with contactless payment credit cards and smartphones. Approximately 2,900 on-board fare validators, 1,000 off-board validators, and 250 vending machines were to be replaced under the contract.

A new website and smartphone app was launched in May 2022 with a weekend-long fare-free period to introduce new validators and card readers. Ticket vending machines for Link light rail were also taken offline for three days as part of the transition. The new website and app allowed for fare management without the previous 24-hour delay. The new card readers and validators initially did not display e-purse balances and pass statues until a later update. The machines' noise was also reduced, which drew criticism from passengers and was later corrected.

The new, black-colored cards debuted in October 2022 as part of a retail rollout following a short beta test period. In 2023, a tap-to-pay option through the ORCA app is planned to be deployed.

Technology

The original card uses the ISO/IEC 14443 RFID standard.  Specifically, the MIFARE DESFire EV1 which "implements all 4 levels of ISO / IEC 14443A and uses optional ISO / IEC 7816-4 commands.".

The new card, which features a black design, includes a barcode for quicker reloading at retail outlets.

Agencies

ORCA is managed by the Central Puget Sound Regional Fare Coordination System, a joint board of directors with representatives of all member transit agencies. Day-to-day management is provided by the staff of Sound Transit and King County Metro.  The system is centrally operated by Vix Technology.

Current
 Community Transit
 Everett Transit
 King County Metro
 King County Water Taxi
 Kitsap Transit (buses and foot ferries)
 Pierce Transit
 Sound Transit (Link light rail, Sounder commuter rail, and Sound Transit Express buses)
 Seattle Streetcar
 Washington State Ferries (accepts E-purse and agency specific passes, does not accept PugetPass)
 Seattle Center Monorail

Products

E-purse

An ORCA card can be used as a stored-value card through a function called the electronic purse (E-purse). The E-purse holds value that can be used like cash to pay fare. The minimum value that can be added to an E-purse is $5. The maximum value that can be stored in an E-purse is $300.

PugetPass 
PugetPass is a regional monthly pass that lets passengers travel on nearly every transit service in the region for a calendar month. A PugetPass is valid for payment of trip fares up to the value of the pass. Trip fares above the value of the pass may be paid with E-purse value. (Example: a passenger who has a $2.50 PugetPass and rides a service that costs $3.75 would have $2.50 covered by the PugetPass and $1.25 would be deducted from their E-Purse). Washington State Ferries does not accept the PugetPass. Pass values available range from 50¢ to $5.75. Passes are priced at $36 per $1 of fare value.

Regional 24-Hour Pass
This pass costs $8 or $4.50 (senior/disabled and youth only) and cover up to $3.50 or $1.75 (senior/disabled and youth only) of fare value per trip on any transit service that honours the PugetPass within 24 hours of first boarding.

Agency specific products and pass
An agency pass covers rides on a specific transit agency's service. Examples include Washington State Ferries' monthly passes, Metro ACCESS paratransit passes, and Metro vanpool passes.

Business products
Employers may purchase one of two products for their employees:

The ORCA Business Passport is comprehensive, annual transportation pass program. Employers pay a flat annual cost per employee and each receives an ORCA card that covers almost all transit services in the Puget Sound, including Vanpool. Employers must cover all employees.

The ORCA Business Choice allows businesses to add funds to employee ORCA cards on a monthly basis in the form of an E-voucher. The E-voucher can be used to purchase a monthly PugetPass or E-purse value. Any unused E-voucher amount at the end of the month is removed from the employee ORCA cards and refunded to the business.

Seattle Public Schools
Seattle's former Mayor Jenny Durkan proposed free ORCA cards for students enrolled in Seattle Public Schools, it is not clear if current mayor Bruce Harrell supports this proposal. Seattle Public Schools has issued ORCA cards to students previously; the Interagency program provided these to students from low-income families and those who live more than two miles from their school.

Features

Transfers
ORCA cards allow a two-hour transfer from the time fare is paid. If an E-purse or regional pass was used to pay fare, transfers are allowed on any bus or rail system in the region. If an agency pass was used, transfers are allowed only on services within that agency. Transfers are stored on the card and automatically calculated for the user. Transfers are not given or accepted on Washington State Ferries.

Fare preset
ORCA card users paying with an E-purse can set their zone preference for King County Metro and Sound Transit services. Since July 2018, King County Metro is single-zone only.

Balance protection
Balance protection protects the user from losing any value on the card when it is lost or stolen. A replacement card is issued with its value restored for the cost of a new card if the card is registered.

Trip protection

Since July 2022, ORCA cards allow for a negative balance of up to $2.75 owed to allow users to continue traveling until they can reach a usable vending machine or reloading station.

Autoload
An Autoload automatically adds transportation products to an ORCA card on a regular basis using a Visa or MasterCard. Examples of autoloads are adding value to an E-purse when its balance falls below a certain amount and recurring purchases of monthly passes.

My ORCA account
A My ORCA account can be created on the ORCA website to monitor and manage ORCA cards. The account lets the user view transportation products stored on their card (E-purse balance, validity period of passes), transaction history, purchase additional ORCA cards for others, set up an Autoload, set fare presets, and report lost, stolen, or damaged cards.

Low-income fare 
The ORCA LIFT program discounts fares to $1.00 per ride for users of the ORCA card earning less than 200 percent of the federal poverty level.

Criticism

New card fee

As of March 2016, a new ORCA card costs $5, one of the highest prices for a public transportation smart card in the United States. The King County Council has requested a study on the impact of either eliminating the $5 fee or adding $5 in value to all newly purchased cards. The report will be due in February 2017.

The $5 fee was waived for all new cards for a three-month period beginning December 1, 2020, due to the COVID-19 pandemic. The fee on youth cards was waived through May 2021 and was later permanently eliminated. The card fee was lowered to $3 with the launch of the new ORCA system in May 2022.

Privacy concerns
The ORCA card, especially subsidized ones, may be used to track users. Information regarding a card user's trips may be released to third parties including employers who subsidize the cards. Other parties may also obtain detailed trip information.

References

External links
 
 FAQ about ORCA by University of Washington graduate students.
 Information on ORCA from Metro Transit
 ORCA Fact Sheet from Kitsap Transit
 Fact Sheet from ERG (archived page)

Fare collection systems in the United States
Contactless smart cards
Sound Transit
King County Metro
2009 introductions
2009 establishments in Washington (state)